Michael John Lamoureux (born June 2, 1976) is a lawyer, lobbyist, and former Republican politician from Russellville, Arkansas. He served in the Arkansas General Assembly for over ten years before resigning to serve as chief of staff to Governor Asa Hutchinson. In 2016, Lamoureux resigned and joined a lobbying firm.

Early life and career
Lamoureux was born in Springfield, Missouri and later moved to Dover in Pope County and then the county seat of Russellville. While a senior at Dover High School and attending Arkansas Tech University, he dreamed of winning election to public office.

He later attended William H. Bowen School of Law at the University of Arkansas at Little Rock. Lamoureux worked part-time as a lawyer for the Arkansas Public Defender Commission.

Electoral history

Arkansas House of Representatives
Lamoureux won election to the Arkansas House of Representatives in November 2002, and was seated in the 84th Arkansas General Assembly at age 26. He served in the House and won re-election twice until declining to seek reelection in the November 2008 election. Throughout his time in the House, Lamoureux was part of the Republican minority, though the party was slowly gaining seats each cycle, and Republican Governor of Arkansas Mike Huckabee was term limited out on January 9, 2007.

2009 Arkansas Senate (Special)
Russellville Republican Sharon Trusty resigned from her Arkansas Senate District 4 seat on September 1, 2009, citing family needs, leading to a special election. Lamoureux had previously campaigned for Trusty in 1996, and sought the seat in the special election. On December 16, 2009, Lamoureux won the special election to fill the District 4 seat. In a low-turnout contest, he polled 2,955 votes (70.1 percent); the Democrat John Burnett trailed with 899 votes (21.3 percent). The remaining 8.6 percent of the ballots went to the Independent Tachany Evans.

  

In 2011, Senator Lamoureux introduced a bill to double vehicle title fees.

2012 Arkansas Senate
Lamoureux won re-election to a full Senate term in November 2012 without opposition in the Republican primary or the general election. Following the November 2012 elections, Lamoureux was nominated by fellow senators to be the President Pro Tempore of the Senate in  ahead of the 89th Arkansas General Assembly. Now in the majority for the first time since the Reconstruction era, the Republican met frequently with Democratic Governor Mike Beebe.

He has been a member of the board of directors of the conservative interest group, the American Legislative Exchange Council.

Arkansas SenateDistrict 16 (Newton and Pope counties and parts of Boone, Carroll and Van Buren counties)

Hutchinson administration

Lamoureux stepped down from the Arkansas Senate on November 14, 2014 to lead the transition team for the incoming governor Asa Hutchinson's administration, and ultimately become his chief of staff. The appointment had been expected by insiders and was praised by legislators from both parties. A special election was called to fill the District 16 seat, ultimately won by Greg Standridge. He resigned from the governor's office May 31, 2016.

References

1976 births
Living people
Republican Party Arkansas state senators
Republican Party members of the Arkansas House of Representatives
Arkansas lawyers
Politicians from Springfield, Missouri
People from Russellville, Arkansas
People from Pope County, Arkansas
Arkansas Tech University alumni
William H. Bowen School of Law alumni